Cornelia Nycke Groot (born 4 May 1988) is a  Dutch handball player.

She represented the Netherlands in three World Women's Handball Championship (winning a silver in Denmark 2015, and a bronze in Germany 2017) and two editions of the Olympic Games.

In January 2019, 14 years after debuting on the Dutch national team, she announced she would be retiring from the national team to focus on her club career.

In 2021, Groot announced she would participate with the Netherlands at the Tokyo Olympic Games. She also announced the end of her club career.

Achievements

National team
 World Championship:
Silver Medalist: 2015
Bronze Medalist: 2017
 European Championship:
Silver Medalist: 2016
Bronze Medalist: 2018

European competitions
EHF Champions League
Winner: 2017, 2018, 2019
Finalist: 2016
Semifinalist: 2014
EHF Cup:
Finalist: 2011
Semifinalist: 2013
EHF Cup Winners' Cup:
Winner: 2015

Domestic competitions
Danish Championship:
Winner: 2013, 2015, 2021
Silver Medalist: 2014
Bronze Medalist: 2012
Danish Cup:
Winner: 2012, 2014, 2020, 2021
Finalist: 2010, 2013
Nemzeti Bajnokság I
Gold Medalist: 2016, 2017, 2018, 2019
Magyar Kupa
Gold Medalist: 2016, 2018, 2019

Individual awards
 All-Star Team Best Centre Back of the EHF Champions League: 2016, 2017
 MVP of the EHF Champions League Final four: 2017
 All-Star Team Best Centre Back of the European Championship: 2016
 MVP of the European Women's Handball Championship: 2016 
 MVP of the Danish Handball Cup: 2010, 2012, 2014
 MVP of the Hungarian Cup Final Four: 2019
 Foreign Handballer of the Year in Hungary: 2016, 2018
 World Handball Female Playmaker of the Decade

References

External links

1988 births
Living people
Dutch female handball players
Sportspeople from Alkmaar
Expatriate handball players
Dutch expatriate sportspeople in Denmark
Dutch expatriate sportspeople in Hungary
Handball players at the 2016 Summer Olympics
Olympic handball players of the Netherlands
Győri Audi ETO KC players
Handball players at the 2020 Summer Olympics
21st-century Dutch women